Sawtell railway station is located on the North Coast line in New South Wales, Australia. It serves the town of Sawtell, opening on 13 July 1925.

Platforms & services
Sawtell has one platform. Each day northbound XPT services operate to Grafton, Casino and Brisbane, with three southbound services operating to Sydney. This station is a request stop, so the train stops only if passengers booked to board/alight here.

References

External links
Sawtell station details Transport for New South Wales

Easy Access railway stations in New South Wales
Railway stations in Australia opened in 1925
Regional railway stations in New South Wales
North Coast railway line, New South Wales